Sam Switkowski (born 20 November 1996) is an Australian rules footballer who plays for the Fremantle Football Club in the Australian Football League (AFL).

Early career

Switkowski attended school at Eltham College. He played for the Northern Knights in the TAC Cup Under 18s competition, winning their best and fairest award in 2014. However, he was overlooked in the 2014 AFL draft and joined the Box Hill Hawks Football Club in the Victorian Football League (VFL). He again missed selection in the 2015 and 2016 drafts, but was recruited by Fremantle with their second last selection, 73rd overall, in the 2017 AFL draft.

AFL career

Despite having an interrupted first season at Fremantle due to hamstring injuries, Switkowski made his AFL debut in Round 21 of the 2018 AFL season, against Carlton at Etihad Stadium. A small forward known for his tackling and other pressure acts, he has been compared to his former Fremantle teammate Hayden Ballantyne. Switkowski missed the 2020 AFL season due to sustaining a stress fracture in his back. Switkowski signed a contract extension during the 2022 AFL season tying him to the club until at least 2024.

Statistics
 Statistics are correct to the end of Semi Final 2022

|- style="background-color: #EAEAEA"
! scope="row" style="text-align:center" | 2018
|
| 39 || 2 || 1 || 1 || 16 || 14 || 30 || 8 || 6 || 0.5 || 0.5 || 8.0 || 7.0 || 15.0 || 4.0 || 3.0 || 0
|-
! scope="row" style="text-align:center" | 2019
|
| 39 || 18 || 6 || 3 || 89 || 116 || 205 || 45 || 89 || 0.3 || 0.2 || 4.9 || 6.4 || 11.4 || 2.5 || 4.9 || 0
|- style="background-color: #EAEAEA"
! scope="row" style="text-align:center" | 2020
|
| 39 || 0 || – || – || – || – || – || – || – || – || – || – || – || – || – || – || –
|-
! scope="row" style="text-align:center" | 2021
|
| 39 || 12 || 9 || 9 || 79 || 67 || 146 || 36 || 32 || 0.8 || 0.8 || 6.6 || 5.6 || 12.2 || 3.0 || 2.7 || 1
|- style="background-color: #EAEAEA"
! scope="row" style="text-align:center" | 2022
|
| 39 || 14 || 11 || 6 || 79 || 122 || 201 || 23 || 63 || 0.7 || 0.4 || 5.6 || 8.7 || 14.3 || 1.6 || 4.5 || TBA
|- class="sortbottom"
! colspan=3| Career
! 46
! 27
! 19
! 263
! 318
! 581
! 112
! 190
! 0.5
! 0.4
! 5.7
! 6.9
! 12.6
! 2.4
! 4.1
! 1
|}

Notes

References

External links

 
WAFL playing statistics

1996 births
Living people
Fremantle Football Club players
Peel Thunder Football Club players
Box Hill Football Club players
Northern Knights players
Australian rules footballers from Victoria (Australia)